Iomnium was a Phoenician, Carthaginian, and Roman port on Algeria's Mediterranean coast at the site of present-day Tigzirt.

Name

The same triliteral root can also mean "craftsman", "artisan", &c.

Geography
Iomnium was located on a peninsula, with the civic buildings located at the end of its cape.

History
The town was established as a colony on the trade route between Phoenicia and the Strait of Gibraltar. It formed part of the Carthaginian Empire and served as the harbor for the fortress at Rusippisir (present-day Taksebt)  to its east.

It fell under Roman hegemony following the Punic Wars. Under Roman rule, Iomnium had the status of a native city in the province of Numidia. Excavation has revealed a moderately-sized Roman emporium. It had a forum, temple, courthouse, and magistrates' office. Its Roman streets were laid out on a grid. A public bath and ornamental mosaic have been found, with inscriptions and statues scattered around.

It was conquered with the rest of the area around it during the late 7thcentury.

Identification of its ruins were long delayed by errors in its mention in the Tabula Peutingeriana, which placed it "42 miles" west of Rusippisir instead of the actual distance of about 2 miles. Iomnium, not Iol, is also probably the Ioulíou mentioned by the Periplus of Pseudo-Scylax, the present text probably representing a scribal error of the original name.

Religion
Iomnium was the seat of a Christian bishopric in antiquity. The ruins of a small basilica have been uncovered. The building has three naves with galleries over the aisles. There was a baptistery of polyfoil plan to the northeast.

The diocese was revived by the Roman Catholic Church as a titular see. The current bishop is Jaime Calderón Calderón.

References

Citations

Bibliography
 .
 
 .

Phoenician colonies in Algeria
Buildings and structures in Tizi Ouzou Province
Roman towns and cities in Algeria